Kostina is a rural locality (a khutor) in Bolshezhirovsky Selsoviet Rural Settlement, Fatezhsky District, Kursk Oblast, Russia. Population:

Geography 
The khutor is located on the Gryaznaya Rudka Brook (a right tributary of the Ruda in the basin of the Svapa), 83.5 km from the Russia–Ukraine border, 35 km north-west of Kursk, 24.5 km south-west of the district center – the town Fatezh, 18 km from the selsoviet center – Bolshoye Zhirovo.

 Climate
Kostina has a warm-summer humid continental climate (Dfb in the Köppen climate classification).

Transport 
Kostina is located 18 km from the federal route  Crimea Highway as part of the European route E105, 23.5 km from the road of regional importance  (Kursk – Lgov – Rylsk – border with Ukraine) as part of the European route E38, 4.5 km from the road of intermunicipal significance  (M2 "Crimea Highway" – Kromskaya), 25 km from the nearest railway halt 433 km (railway line Lgov I — Kursk).

The rural locality is situated 39.5 km from Kursk Vostochny Airport, 148 km from Belgorod International Airport and 240 km from Voronezh Peter the Great Airport.

References

Notes

Sources

Rural localities in Fatezhsky District